Khlibodarske is an urban-type settlement in Odesa Raion of Odesa Oblast in Ukraine. It is essentially a western suburb of the city of Odesa. Khlibodarske belongs to Avanhard settlement hromada, one of the hromadas of Ukraine. Population: 

Until 18 July 2020, Khlibodarske belonged to Biliaivka Raion. The raion was abolished in July 2020 as part of the administrative reform of Ukraine, which reduced the number of raions of Odesa Oblast to seven. The area of Biliaivka Raion was merged into Odesa Raion.

Economy

Transportation
The closest railway station, located in Odesa, is Novodepovska. It is on the railway line which connects Odesa via Rozdilna and Podilsk with Vinnytsia. There is some passenger traffic.

The settlement is included into Odesa road network. In particular, it lies between M15 and M16, which connect Odesa with Reni via Izmail and with Moldovan border at Kuchurhan, respectively.

References

Urban-type settlements in Odesa Raion